The 2003 Dutch TT was the seventh round of the 2003 MotoGP Championship. It took place on the weekend of 26–28 June 2003 at the TT Circuit Assen located in Assen, Netherlands.

MotoGP race report

This race was most notable for the drama that went on before the start of the race, the extremely wet weather conditions the race was held in, Loris Capirossi's initial start from the pit lane despite starting from pole position and Sete Gibernau's battle with Max Biaggi for the victory.

After six rounds, Valentino Rossi still leads the title hunt with 135 points. Behind him in relative distance is Sete Gibernau with 88 and Max Biaggi with 85 points.

Before the start, there was drama as polesitter Loris Capirossi might have to start from the pitlane. He set a time of 1:59.770 but was still in the pit lane minutes before the start. Second on the grid is Max Biaggi, third is Valentino Rossi and fourth Carlos Checa. Completing the second row of the grid is fifth place Olivier Jacque, sixth place Alex Barros, seventh place Sete Gibernau and eighth place Marco Melandri. Kenny Roberts Jr. did not participate in the race due to a crash at the Italian race where he sustained tissue damage and had to miss both the Catalan and current round. Replacing him is Suzuki test rider Yukio Kagayama

There was further confusion as the race was initially classified as wet, but during the official sighting lap by the safety car, officials declared the track to be dry enough to start with slick tyres, thus declaring it a dry race minutes before the start. As all the riders did their usual sighting lap, it started to rain again and Rossi put his arm up in the air to signal that he did not want to start this way. As an act of defiance, he went into the pits and urged everyone to do likewise, following him to switch bikes on grounds of safety reasons. Mechanics quickly change the tyres on the bikes to put on the full wets, delaying the start. 

As all the riders and mechanics were still preparing, the new race start was pushed back to 15:50 with the pit lane reopening at 15:40 for a total of five minutes. The officials declared that the race distance still remains 19 laps, which is the original race distance.

During the opening of the pit lane, some take off and do a sighting lap. Officials declared that they are allowed to do one sighting lap, followed by a grid formation and one warm-up before the start. During the sighting lap, one of the riders - Nobuatsu Aoki - got stuck in the gravel and couldn't get out.

After a relative period of waiting, all the riders line up on a now rain soaked grid and begin the warm-up lap. Because of the reshuffle and delayed start, Capirossi will start in pole position as usual. Aoki however does have to start from the pits because he could not make the start in time. The same thing happened to Aoki's teammate Jeremy McWilliams, meaning that both will have to start from the back of the grid. 

All riders slowly slot into their respective grid positions and as the lights go out, it is Rossi who has the best start and moves up into the lead at the S-Bocht (Turn 1), followed by Biaggi in second and Gibernau in third, moving up from seventh and taking multiple positions by going on the right side of the circuit. Barros makes up multiple positions from the second row and moves up into fourth, also benefiting from Capirossi's appalling start which dropped him way back into the field after he failed to get away properly. Jacque, who initially looked to have a bad start, managed to get away well and overtakes multiple people before going up the inside of teammate Barros at the Haarbocht (Turn 2) for fourth position. Also at the Haarbocht, Gibernau surprises both Rossi and Biaggi by lunging up their insides and taking over the lead of the race after just two corners, with Biaggi also snatching second from Rossi in the process. The young Italian now had lost two positions in one corner on the opening lap. The duo then opens up a slight gap back to Rossi. At the straight before the medium speed unnamed right hander before Strubben, a charging Troy Bayliss goes up the inside of Barros and takes fifth place from him. At the Ruskenhoek (Turn 8), Jacque closes up on Rossi and Jacque looks to make a move on 'The Doctor' at the Stekkenwal (Turn 9) but decides to stay behind for the time being. Jacque then takes third from Rossi, almost immediately followed by Bayliss who goes up his inside at the fast Meeuwenmeer corner (Turn 13) for fourth position, relegating Rossi from third to fifth in just a few corners. However, just before the entrance of the Geert Timmer Bocht (Turn 16), he makes a late lunge and dives up the inside of Bayliss to take back fourth place in the process.

On lap two, Barros is now close to Bayliss at the S-Bocht but does not yet make a move. At the Ossebroeken (Turn 4), Biaggi makes his move and takes the lead from Gibernau by passing him via the inside, with Rossi trying to catch Jacque in the meantime. At the Stekkenwal, Barros tries to dive down the inside of Bayliss but fails and has to stay behind for the time being. Behind barros is rookie Colin Edwards on the Alice Aprilia in seventh place. At the Geert Timmer Bocht, Rossi outbrakes Jacque and passes him entering the right-left-right hander to take third place. Exiting the corner, Jacque has a slight wobble which allows Bayliss to get close to him and pass him for fourth at the start/finish straight.

Lap three and Biaggi now sets the fastest lap of the race. Barros also passes his teammate and takes fifth position. The top six now consists as follows: Biaggi, Gibernau, Rossi, Bayliss, Barros and Jacque. Edwards is now also closing the gap on sixth place Jacque. Gibernau's gap back to Rossi is +1.239 seconds in sector one, increasing to +1.364 seconds in sector two. At the short, unnamed right-hand kink before De Bult (Turn 10), Gibernau goes alongside Biaggi and passes him for the lead. However, exiting De Bult, Gibernau has a slight wobble and loses the place back to Biaggi. Jacque has also repassed Barros earlier on for fifth.

On lap four, Gibernau goes again side-by-side with Biaggi on the start/finish straight, forcing the Italian to go onto the grass almost and back off slightly at the S-Bocht, aggressively taking over the lead once more. Gibernau also sets the fastest lap, only for that honour to fall to Noriyuki Haga down in eighth place. A bit further behind, Rossi is now under pressure from Bayliss in fourth, Jacque is riding away from teammate Barros, who himself is now coming under pressure from Edwards. Rossi is starting to open up a slight gap back to Bayliss.

Lap five and Gibernau now sets the fastest lap again. Bayliss closes the small gap right back up at the Haarbocht and overtakes Rossi at the outside of the corner, promoting him to third. At the Ramshoek and Geert Timmer Bocht corners, Rossi gets closer to Bayliss but isn't able to quite make a move and even has a slight moment exiting the corner sequence.

On lap six, Bayliss crashes out of contention. He tries to pull his bike back up as the marshalls speed towards him to help him, the Australian urging them to push start his bike. He gets going again eventually but has to start all the way back in a lowly sixteenth after losing many places. This promotes all the midfield runners (Jacque, Barros, Edwards and Haga) up by one place. Gibernau is now opening up a small gap to Biaggi in second place.

Lap seven and the top two now have a big gap back to third place Rossi. The gap Biaggi has to Rossi is +5.021 seconds in sector one, decreasing slightly to +4.939 seconds in sector two.

On lap eight, Biaggi now sets the fastest lap. Haga now overtakes teammate Edwards at the S-Bocht for fifth place. Exiting Duikersloot (Turn 12), Gibernau has a slight moment but does not lose any time or places. Checa now goes up the inside of Barros at 
Mandeven (Turn 11) for seventh place.

Lap nine and Gibernau has set the fastest lap of the race. The top six is as follows: Gibernau, Biaggi, Rossi, Jacque, Haga and Edwards. During this lap, Biaggi closes the small gap to Gibernau and starts to put pressure on the Spaniard.

On lap ten - the halfway point of the race - and Gibernau is still leading the race. His gap back to Biaggi is +0.895 seconds at the start/finish straight but closes again significantly in sector one. By now, the top two start encounter some backmarkers, most notably Aoki and Garry McCoy. McCoy lets Gibernau through with relative ease, but blocks Biaggi significantly in the middle of the Geert Timmer Bocht, causing him to lose valuable time and touch with the Spaniard.

Lap eleven and Biaggi now has it all to do to fix the small gap created by backmarker McCoy. This has opened up a +0.912 second gap back to Biaggi for Gibernau. McWilliams has crashed out of the race and is ignoring the marshalls who are more concerned with removing his bike from the gravel.

On lap twelve, Gibernau sets another fastest lap and extends the gap he has to Biaggi. Third place Rossi is also trying to pass some backmarkers but is forced to go onto the slippery exit chicane at the Geert Timmer Bocht while trying to pass Makoto Tamada.

Lap thirteen and Aoki has also gone down, the marshalls pushing his bike away from the circuit. He lost the front at De Bult and almost hits Barros as he rolls onto the circuit, who can narrowly avoid him and slow down. 

On lap fourteen, Gibernau now has to overtake the other Kawasaki backmarker in the form of Andrew Pitt, whom he overtakes without any problems. Checa is now rapidly closing in on Jacque exiting the Ramshoek and makes his move at the entrance of the Geert Timmer Bocht, passing Jacque for fifth position on the inside of him.

Lap fifteen and the gap Gibernau has to Biaggi is now +6.743 seconds. By now, a small dry line is starting to form as the rain has eased, if not stopped completely.

On lap sixteen, Gibernau is still in the lead. Exiting De Bult, Rossi has a slight moment on the exit of the corner but easily manages to stay on the bike. Melandri has entered the pits and retires from the race. Kagayama has also crashed out of the race, the Suzuki test rider walks away unhurt in disappointment.

Lap seventeen and Gibernau is still leading without any problems. The gap Biaggi has to Rossi is now +4.954 seconds. The circuit has now dried up significantly. Haga is now starting to struggle significantly, having a moment exiting the Strekkenwal (Turn 9) and allowing Checa to close up at a rapid pace. Jacque behind also has a bit of a moment.

On lap eighteen and Haga is still ahead of Checa who wants to find a way past. Behind them, Capirossi is also trying to overtake Jacque for sixth spot. Gibernau's gap to Biaggi is now +9.733 seconds.

Lap nineteen, the penultimate lap, has begun and Haga has crashed out of the race, highsiding over a puddle and failing to keep it after Checa had already passed him. Confused and disappointed he stands up and looks at his wrecked bike in the dirt and grass, knowing that his race is finished.

The final lap - lap twenty - has begun and Gibernau still has a massive lead over the competition. Biaggi is still second and Rossi still third. There are no troubles for the Telefónica Movistar Honda rider, who cruises home, even checking behind him to see if no one is there and then standing up as a total sign of victory to cross the line and win the race - his third win of the season. A bit further behind is a jubilant Biaggi who comes home second, possibly because he knows he has defeated Rossi today. Rossi himself however crosses the line third with a big wheelie, knowing he's still leading the championship. In fourth comes home a satisfied Checa, in fifth Jacque and in sixth Capirossi.

On the parade lap back to parc-fermé, Gibernau celebrated by putting his finger in the air, then tries to stand up on his bike again. He also waves at the crowd and makes kissing gestures at the audience. He then stands up on his bike once more and fistpumps the air. Biaggi celebrates likewise, waving at the audience and being complimented by the marshalls. Rossi however, straight up does multiple wheelies to celebrate instead. Gibernau then stops to do a burnout in front of the fans, much to their and the nearby marshalls approval. The track gets invaded by some of Gibernau's fans, who surround him and give him the Spanish flag, to which he continues his way shortly after, waving the flag with pride. He continues his festivities with the crowd cheering him on. The other two men, Biaggi and Rossi, now slowly make their way back to parc-fermé as the marshals greet them on. On the way back, Rossi runs out of fuel and then tries to push his bike by foot.

Back at the garage already is Capirossi, who is talking to his team about the race. Biaggi is the first to arrive at parc-ferme, the 'Roman Emperor' shaking hands with some of the Repsol Honda mechanics, then with some of his own Camel Pramac Pons crewmembers. Gibernau is still on his way, celebrating and saluting the fans in glee. Fireworks are now being lit on some parts of the track, causing parts to be badly visible due to smoke. When arriving at parc-fermé, he gets greeted by his Telefónica Movistar Honda crew and steps off his bike to go and greet Sito Pons, then members of his own team. The last one to arrive is Rossi, who calmly stays on the bike and takes off his gloves and helmet.

The trio now make their way onto the podium, with Valentino Rossi the first to arrive under a loud cheering from the crowd. Next up is a delighted Biaggi in second and in the end Gibernau comes up with the crowd valiantly cheering as he happily appears. He gives Rossi and Biaggi a hand and then steps onto the top step, holding up his helmet in joy before putting it down. Circuit owner Jos Vaessen hands Rossi the third place trophy, the Italian waving happily at the crowd while holding up his trophy. He does likewise to Biaggi who also happily holds up his trophy. Jean-Pierre Aujoulet, the then Sponsoring Manager at Gauloises, hands Gibernau the trophy, which he happily accepts, kisses and then slowly holds up for all to see. The Spanish national anthem plays for Gibernau and the crowd applauds once it stops, shouting "Sete! Sete!" as well. The trio then receives the champagne and Gibernau immediately starts to spray the audience, with Rossi cheekily spraying one of the podium girls instead. Rossi - now wearing glasses - then sprays it at the crowd as well as on Gibernau, who does likewise. Biaggi also sprays the crowd before drinking some of it. The riders, except for Rossi, then put the champagne down as they all pose for a photo moment together.

Gibernau's win now means he closes the gap to Rossi in the title hunt, albeit slowly. Biaggi's second place also keeps him alive and Rossi's third place solidifies his championship lead. Rossi now has 151 points, Gibernau 113 and Biaggi 105 points.

MotoGP classification

250 cc classification

125 cc classification

Championship standings after the race (motoGP)

Below are the standings for the top five riders and constructors after round seven has concluded.

Riders' Championship standings

Constructors' Championship standings

 Note: Only the top five positions are included for both sets of standings.

References

Dutch TT
Dutch
Tourist Trophy